Henderson Street Bridge is located in Fort Worth, Texas. It was erected in 1930.  The bridge spans over the Clear Fork of the Trinity River.

It was added to the National Register of Historic Places as part of the Historic Bridges of Texas MPS on March 21, 2011.

Photo gallery

See also

National Register of Historic Places listings in Tarrant County, Texas
List of bridges on the National Register of Historic Places in Texas

References

External links

National Register of Historic Places in Fort Worth, Texas
Transportation buildings and structures in Fort Worth, Texas
Road bridges in Texas
Concrete bridges in the United States
Open-spandrel deck arch bridges in the United States